Volodymyr Mykolajovych Shandra is Ukrainian politician and former Governor of Kyiv Oblast.

Education 
Since 1981, he studied at the Faculty of Nuclear Power Plants and equipment for the Moscow Engineering Physics Institute (later — Obninsk Institute for Nuclear Power Engineering), specializing in thermal power engineer. In 2006 he graduated from the National Academy of Management, where he received a master's degree in finance.

PhD in Economics. He defended his thesis on technological innovation economy in innovative practice.

Work Experience 
1980 — started his career grinder for the production association "Ternopil combine factory".

1987 — after graduation he worked at the Khmelnytskyi Nuclear Power Plant, where he rose from the reactor operator's compartment, a senior engineer with repair and maintenance of equipment of the reactor compartment to the chief engineer of the control reactor.

From 1992 to 2002 works in private sector of economics.

Politics 
In 2002, Vladimir Shandra elected deputy of Ukraine under Yushchenko Bloc "Our Ukraine" (No. 39). He was Deputy Chairman of the Verkhovna Rada of Ukraine on Industrial Policy and Entrepreneurship.

In the presidential election of 2004 was led by Khmelnytsky Regional Headquarters coalition "People Power".

From February 2005 to August 2006 served as Minister of Industrial policy of Ukraine.

In 2006–2007 — Advisor to the President of Ukraine. He was Chairman of the NGO "Institute for Social and Economic Development".

In 2006–2008 — member of the supervisory board of the State Savings Bank of Ukraine and the State Export-Import Bank.

In the parliamentary elections of 2007, ran for Parliament Bloc "Our Ukraine — People's Self-Defense" (No. 75). At the head of the electoral re-election headquarters in Khmelnytsky region.

18 December 2007 – 11 March 2010 — Minister of Ukraine of Emergencies and Affairs of Population Protection from the Consequences of Chornobyl Catastrophe (appointed by the Supreme Council of Ukraine No. 10-VI of 18 December 2007 and dismissed by the Verkhovna Rada of Ukraine on 11 March 2010 number 1965-VI).

He was a member of the party "People's Union "Our Ukraine".

On 2 March 2014 Acting President Oleksandr Turchynov appointed Shandra Governor of Kyiv Oblast. Shandra resigned from this post on 27 January 2016. Seven days later he was appointed as advisor to President Petro Poroshenko.

Family 
Wife Antonina Єvgenіvna (1960).

He has two sons — Andrew (1980) and Anton (1994).

Awards and titles 
A civil servant rank 1 (October 2006). He was awarded the Order of Merit III degree (September 2008).

References

External links 
Biography

1963 births
People from Zboriv
Our Ukraine (political party) politicians
Living people
Industrial policy ministers of Ukraine
Emergency ministers of Ukraine
Fourth convocation members of the Verkhovna Rada
Recipients of the Order of Merit (Ukraine), 3rd class
Governors of Kyiv Oblast
Obninsk Institute for Nuclear Power Engineering alumni